__notoc__

Thomas Neil Guay (born October 11, 1965), more commonly known by his stage name Tom Five (or Tom 5), is an American guitar player who joined White Zombie while studying art at Parsons School of Design which he attended from 1985 to 1989. Guay is more widely known as Tom Five, reportedly because his style "sounded like five guitarists playing at once". He played guitar for the metal band Angel Rot from 1988 to 2003, releasing the album Unlistenable Hymns of Indulgent Damage in 1999. He was also performed in the band Sonic Medusa and in the Black Sabbath tribute band Rat Salad. He currently plays guitar for the Los Angeles band Triple T.

Discography

With White Zombie
 Psycho-Head Blowout (1987)
 Soul-Crusher (1987)

With Angel Rot
 Unlistenable Hymns of Indulgent Damage (1999)

References

American heavy metal guitarists
White Zombie (band) members
Living people
1966 births